Micromonospora costi is a spore-forming bacterium from the genus Micromonospora which has been isolated from leaves of the plant Costus speciosus.

References

 

Micromonosporaceae
Bacteria described in 2015